Płociczno may refer to the following places:
Płociczno, Masovian Voivodeship (east-central Poland)
Płociczno, Podlaskie Voivodeship (north-east Poland)
Płociczno, Pomeranian Voivodeship (north Poland)
Płociczno, Warmian-Masurian Voivodeship (north Poland)
Płociczno, West Pomeranian Voivodeship (north-west Poland)
Płociczno-Tartak (north-east Poland)